Greg Wilson (born October 11, 1966, in Highland Park, Illinois) is an American curler from Vernon Hills, Illinois.

At the national level, he is a 1998 United States men's champion curler and a 2014 United States mixed champion curler.

Teams

Men's

Mixed

Personal life
He started curling in 1975 at the age of 9. He is a third generation curler in the Chicago area. Most of his family curls. His wife, mom, dad and he have been to two Mixed Nationals together and are still curling in leagues together. Greg and his wife Pam won 2014 Mixed Nationals.

He graduated from the University of Wisconsin–Stevens Point (bachelor's degree) and DePaul University (master's degree).

References

External links

1966 births
Living people
People from Highland Park, Illinois
Sportspeople from Chicago
American male curlers
American curling champions
University of Wisconsin–Stevens Point alumni
DePaul University alumni